The 2002 Canoe Sprint European Championships were held in Szeged, Hungary.

Medal overview

Men

Women

Medal table

References

External links
 European Canoe Association

Canoe Sprint European Championships
2002 in Hungarian sport
2002 in canoeing
Canoeing in Hungary
Sport in Szeged